Sycamore is the name of some places in the U.S. state of Oklahoma:
Sycamore, Delaware County, Oklahoma
Sycamore, Sequoyah County, Oklahoma